Ganito (Tagalog "like this") is a Tagalog language song, and the second single off Sarah Geronimo's This 15 Me album, the song was written by Nica del Rosario, the songsmith behind Geronimo's chart-topping hits including the previous single "Sandata". It was released digitally on April 1, 2018 under Viva Records. Ganito instantly topped iTunes chart and also landed on Spotify Philippines Viral 50.

Background 
Songwriter Nica del Rosario shared via Twitter that Sarah wrote the words in a whole paper, back and front, singled spaced to be used for the song. It was originally about "this is how you lose her", Sarah thought that the idea was sad and negative, so she collaborates to change the theme from "this is how you lose her" to "this is how you don't." Most of the lines were of Sarah's metaphors and poetic insights.

Release History 
The song became available for download on iTunes on the night of March 31, 2018 and became officially released on other digital music stores and streaming services the next day. The song topped the iTunes songs chart few minutes after it was released. It became the most downloaded song on the said platform for 4 consecutive days, it slipped from number one to four due to the release of BTS' Face Yourself album, but managed to climb up again and charted at number two, only behind Sarah Geronimo's new release "Duyan." Sarah Geronimo became the face of Spotify's New Music Friday Philippines for the week of April 6 with her two latest singles on the playlist. "Ganito" also peaked at number 15 on Spotify Viral 50 Philippines on April 10 with over 100,000 streams despite not having radio airplay and promotions.

Music Video 
The official lyric video and music video of the song is yet to be released.

Live Performances 
Sarah Geronimo performed the song on her record-breaking 15th anniversary concert, "This 15 Me" on April 14, 2018 at the Araneta Coliseum. On July 28, 2019 this single launch on ASAP Natin 'To.

Charts

iTunes

References 

https://www.instagram.com/p/BhGcyKZnz27/&saved-by=urzula.meowmeow

2018 songs
Sarah Geronimo songs
2018 singles
Tagalog-language songs